Esther Elizabeth Manheimer (born July 24, 1971) is an American politician and attorney serving as the mayor of Asheville, North Carolina.

Early life and education 
Manheimer was born on July 24, 1971, in the hamlet of Skyum Bjerge in Thy, Denmark, to American expat parents. She has two siblings. Her family returned to the United States when she was three, and she lived in San Diego, Olympia, Spokane, and Bethesda, Maryland before moving to Asheville when she was 17.

Manheimer graduated from the University of Colorado Boulder, and she served as campus director of the American Movement for Israel and earned a Bachelor of Arts degree in anthropology. She attended the University of North Carolina at Chapel Hill, earning degrees in law and a Master of Public Administration.

Career 
After graduating from University of North Carolina at Chapel Hill, Manheimer returned to Asheville, North Carolina in 2002. She was elected to the Asheville City Council in 2009 and served until 2013. She was elected mayor of Asheville in 2013.

In March 2016, Manheimer spoke out against the controversial Public Facilities Privacy & Security Act, state legislation that eliminated anti-discrimination protections for the LGBT community.

In June 2021, Manheimer was one of 11 U.S. mayors to form Mayors Organized for Reparations and Equity (MORE), a coalition of municipal leaders dedicated to starting pilot reparations programs in their cities. (Earlier, in July 2020, the Asheville City Council had "voted to approve reparations in the form of investments in areas of disparity for Black residents.")

Personal life 
Manheimer is married to Mark Harris. They have three sons. She is the third Jewish mayor of Asheville, after Ken Michalove in 1989 and Leni Sitnik in 1997.

Electoral History

References 

Mayors of Asheville, North Carolina
Living people
Asheville, North Carolina City Council members
North Carolina Democrats
Women mayors of places in North Carolina
Year of birth missing (living people)
University of Colorado Boulder alumni
University of North Carolina School of Law alumni
UNC School of Government alumni
Women city councillors in North Carolina
21st-century American politicians
21st-century American women politicians
Jewish mayors of places in the United States
Jewish women politicians
Jewish American people in North Carolina politics
Jewish American attorneys
People from Thisted Municipality
21st-century American Jews